Statistics of Division 2 in the 1952–53 season.

Overview
It was contested by 18 teams, and Toulouse won the championship.

League standings

References
France - List of final tables (RSSSF)

French
2
Ligue 2 seasons